Sharomy (Russian: Шаромы) (also referred to as Sheromy) is a Naval air base in Kamchatka Krai, Russia located about 143 km north of Petropavlovsk-Kamchatsky.  Sharomy contains hardstands for 12 bombers and 3 fighters.  It is believed to serve as a dispersal airfield for Soviet Naval Aviation, and may also be a staging airfield for Long Range Aviation.

The US intelligence community noted the first appearance of military aircraft at the airfield in September 1967, when three Tupolev Tu-16 were identified on KH-4 satellite imagery.  The same report listed the airfield as having a 9950 x 250 ft (3000 x 75 m) graded earth runway and limited support facilities, however the runway was paved and the airfield expanded in the late 1960s or 1970s.

A US intelligence report noted a Naval Aviation Tu-16K Badger-G at the airfield in 1979.

Satellite imagery from early 2018 showed that the runway is plowed in the wintertime, indicating the base remains operational or in caretaker status.

References

Russian Air Force bases
Soviet Air Force bases